Ch'iyar Qullu (Aymara ch'iyara black, qullu mountain, "black mountain", also spelled Chiar Kkollu) is a  mountain in the north of the Cordillera Real in the Andes of Bolivia. It is situated in the La Paz Department, Larecaja Province, Sorata Municipality.

References 

Mountains of La Paz Department (Bolivia)